The Men's omnium was held on 21 October 2016; 21 riders competed across four events.

Results

Scratch race
Standings after 1 event.

Tempo race
Standings after 2 events.

Note
Despite being marked DNF, Andrej Strmiska still increased his overall score by 2 as he collected 2 points within the race.

Elimination race
Standings after 3 events.

Points race and final standings
Riders' points from the previous 3 events were carried into the points race, in which the final standings were decided.

References

Men's omnium
European Track Championships – Men's omnium